Carlos Alberto Maya Lizcano (born 16 March 1972) is a Venezuelan former professional track and road racing cyclist. He competed in three consecutive Summer Olympics for his native country: 1992, 1996 and 2000. He also rode in the 1995 Vuelta a España, where he finished 47th overall.

Major results

1992
 3rd Road race, National Road Championships
1993
 2nd Road race, National Road Championships
1995
 1st  Overall Vuelta al Táchira
1998
 8th Overall Vuelta al Táchira
2000
 2nd Overall Vuelta al Táchira
1st Stages 7 & 12
2001
 2nd Overall Vuelta al Táchira
1st Stage 9
2003
 1st  Overall Clasico Ciclistico Banfoandes 
 2nd Overall Vuelta al Táchira
2004
 3rd Overall Vuelta a Guatemala
1st Stages 11 & 12
 3rd Overall Vuelta al Táchira
2005
 1st Stage 3a Vuelta a Venezuela (TTT) (with Iván Castillo, José Serpa, Franklin Chacón, Manuel Medina, & Nelson Gelvez)
 3rd Overall Vuelta al Táchira
1st Stage 14
 4th Overall Clasico Ciclistico Banfoandes
1st Stage 6
2006
 9th Overall Vuelta al Táchira
2007
 4th Overall Vuelta al Táchira
1st Stage 2 (TTT) (with José Chacón Díaz, Jackson Rodríguez, Rónald González, and César Salazar)
 5th Overall Clasico Ciclistico Banfoandes
1st Stage 7

References

External links
 
Venezuelan cyclists

1972 births
Living people
Venezuelan male cyclists
Vuelta a Venezuela stage winners
Cyclists at the 1992 Summer Olympics
Cyclists at the 1996 Summer Olympics
Cyclists at the 2000 Summer Olympics
Olympic cyclists of Venezuela
People from Caracas
20th-century Venezuelan people
21st-century Venezuelan people